A by-election was held for the New South Wales Legislative Assembly electorate of East Macquarie on 1 December 1873 because Sir James Martin's seat was declared vacant on accepting appointment as Chief Justice of New South Wales.

Dates

Result

Sir James Martin was appointed Chief Justice of New South Wales.

See also
Electoral results for the district of East Macquarie
List of New South Wales state by-elections

References

1873 elections in Australia
New South Wales state by-elections
1870s in New South Wales